Egton is a village and civil parish in the Scarborough local administration district of North Yorkshire county, England, about  west of Whitby, and located within the North York Moors National Park. There is a nearby village called Egton Bridge, which is home to Egton railway station. 

The village was included in the Survey of English Dialects, published in various forms between 1962 and 1996. Unlike the other sites, a full book was written on the local dialect by Hans Tidholm. According to the 2011 UK census, Egton parish had a population of 448, a reduction on the 2001 UK census figure of 459.

History

Egton is an important local centre for family history. Prior to 1880, many important birth, marriage and death records were administered from Egton parish. The church in Egton holds detailed transcriptions of parish records. The cemetery is half a mile west, at the old church site. After 1870 many parishioners were buried at nearby Aislaby.

Events
Egton is home to the Egton Road Race or Gooseberry Run, an annual charity race around the village, which was first held in 2001 to raise funds to save St Hilda’s Chapel from demolition.

Sport
Egton Cricket Club is based on the Egton Recreation Ground, on the northern outskirts of the village. The club has a Midweek Senior XI in the Esk Valley Evening League and a junior section that compete in the Derwent Valley Junior Cricket League.

References

External links

Villages in North Yorkshire
Civil parishes in North Yorkshire